In algebraic topology, the doomsday conjecture was a conjecture about Ext groups over the Steenrod algebra made by Joel Cohen, named by Michael Barratt, published by  and disproved by .  stated a modified version called the new doomsday conjecture.

The original doomsday conjecture was that for any prime p and positive integer s there are only a finite number of permanent cycles in

 found an infinite number of permanent cycles for p = s = 2, disproving the conjecture.  Minami's new doomsday conjecture is a weaker form stating (in the case p = 2) that there are no nontrivial permanent cycles in the image of (Sq0)n for n sufficiently large depending on s.

References

Algebraic topology